What Can I Say may refer to:

 What Can I Say (Carrie Underwood song)
 What Can I Say (Dead by April song)
 "What Can I Say", a 1976 song by Boz Scaggs

See also
 "(What Can I Say) To Make You Love Me", a song by Alexander O'Neal